Pedro Lonchibuco (c.1920 – 7 June 1987) was an Argentine gymnast who competed in the 1948 Summer Olympics.

References

Gymnasts at the 1948 Summer Olympics
Olympic gymnasts of Argentina
1987 deaths
1920 births
Argentine male artistic gymnasts
Pan American Games medalists in gymnastics
Pan American Games gold medalists for Argentina
Pan American Games silver medalists for Argentina
Gymnasts at the 1951 Pan American Games
20th-century Argentine people